The Timex Open was a professional golf tournament. The tournament was held at Biarritz Golf Club in Biarritz, France. The tournament was originally a domestic event before transitioning into a European Tour event in 1983 and 1984.

Winners

References

External links
Coverage on the European Tour's official site

Former European Tour events
Defunct golf tournaments in France
Sport in Biarritz